Guadalupe, Spain may mean:

 Guadalupe (Spain), a river
 Guadalupe, Cáceres, a municipality in Extremadura
 Santa María de Guadalupe, a monastery in Guadalupe, Extremadura, Spain
 Guadalupe, Murcia, a village in the municipality and region of Murcia